Erik Griffin is an American stand-up comedian, writer, podcaster and actor. He played Montez Walker on Comedy Central's Workaholics.

He has had acting roles in Mike and Dave Need Wedding Dates, I'm Dying Up Here, and Blunt Talk.

Early life 
Griffin was born in Los Angeles. He was raised by his immigrant mother from Belize. He never met his father.

Career 
Griffin started doing stand-up in 2003. Prior to this, he worked at a school coaching basketball and handling office work.

Griffin recorded a half-hour special for Comedy Central on February 28, 2013. Later that year, he released his first stand-up album, Technical Foul: Volume One, on March 12, 2013.

Erik Griffin: The Ugly Truth premiered on July 7, 2017 on Showtime. His next special Amerikan Warrior also premiered on Showtime in June 2018.

Beginning in 2022, Brendan Schaub and Theo Von added Chris D'Elia to their weekly podcast "King and the Sting", renaming it to "King and the Sting and Wing". During this time Griffin became a regular guest-host. On November 4, 2022, "King and the Sting and Wing" was officially renamed "The Golden Hour", with Griffin Replacing Theo Von. He also hosts his own podcast, Riffin' With Griffin.

Documentary appearances

References

External links
 
 

American stand-up comedians
Living people
American male television actors
American television writers
American male film actors
Place of birth missing (living people)
Year of birth missing (living people)
American male television writers
American people of Belizean descent